Charlotte Kate Fox (born August 14, 1985) is an American film, TV, and theatrical actress and musician. She was cast as the first non-Japanese heroine of an NHK Asadora: the series Massan broadcast on Japanese television.

Education
Fox attended Marymount Manhattan College for seven months studying theater, but moved back to Santa Fe and graduated with honors with a Bachelor of Fine Arts in Theater in 2008.

In 2013, Fox graduated with an MFA from Northern Illinois University. During her time at Northern Illinois University, Fox also attended summer workshops held at the Stella Adler Studio of Acting in New York City.

On May 16, 2015, Fox received an honorary doctorate from the Santa Fe University of Art and Design, formerly known as the College of Santa Fe, during the commencement ceremony where Fox was the commencement speaker.

Acting career
Fox began her acting career at age 16 when she appeared as an extra in the Starz television series Crash. After that, she appeared in professional and regional theater productions, eventually obtaining her Equity membership while performing in the Actor's Theatre of Charlotte's Venus in Fur as Vanda. She appeared in smaller independent films, until she was cast as the first foreign lead of the 150-episode NHK Japanese morning drama Massan playing Ellie, a character based on the real-life Rita Cowan (Taketsuru Rita). Fox was chosen from among 521 applicants (232 from Japan, 289 from outside Japan).

Fox appeared in all 150 episodes of this run of the NHK Asadora (Morning Drama). Fox's performance was entirely in Japanese, save occasional scenes which naturally called for English, e.g., retrospective scenes in the character's home in Scotland (actually shot on locations in Japan such as Hokkaido). This was true despite the fact that she had not had any prior experience in the Japanese language nor had she visited Japan previous to her trip to perform for the show's screen test. Each line of Fox's script included three additional lines, the first of which was the romanized script of the Japanese line, followed by the translated line in English, and finally by the word-for-word literal translation in English which follows the Japanese word order. This way Fox would not only learn the Japanese lines but also acknowledge where each word would occur in a given line, thus acting according to the Japanese word order whether the lines were uttered by her or by her co-performers. This caused Fox's script to be ten times thicker than that for the native Japanese co-actors on the show. "If I had been in Charlotte's position, I would have run away to America," said Tetsuji Tamayama, co-lead who played the eponymous character who is married to Fox's character Ellie. When polled by NHK as to the reasons for watching Massan, 60% of the viewers chose Fox as the reason (second only to "Interesting story and theme" at 65%).

The final episode of Massan aired on March 28, 2015. The show recorded the mean audience ratings of 21.1% through its run, ranking third-highest of the past 20 Asadora titles.

In February of 2015, an announcement was made that Fox had landed the role of the lead character Roxie Hart in the Broadway musical production of Chicago, which has been continuously running at the Ambassador Theatre in New York since 1996. She is scheduled to perform there from November 2 to November 15, 2015. Fox will also perform in Japan on a tour of Chicago in Tokyo December 4 thru 23, 2015 and in Osaka December 26 and 27, 2015.

On August 19, 2015 NHK aired on its satellite broadcasting channel a documentary program entitled あの歌に出会いたい~シャーロットの沖縄歌探しの旅～(I Want to Meet That Song – Charlotte's Journey in Search of Okinawa's Songs), in which Fox was the principal traveler. This was her first trip ever to Okinawa.

On September 5, 2015, TV Asahi of Japan aired a made-for-TV movie entitled 名探偵キャサリン (Detective Catherine), based on the detective novel series by Misa Yamamura (山村美紗), in which Fox performed in the lead role of Catherine Turner, a multilingual Columbia University graduate and the only daughter of a former vice president of the United States. The show was entirely in Japanese, except where English was appropriate, as was the case with Massan.

Music
On April 29, 2015 Fox released in Japan a single music CD entitled Gondola no Uta. Then on August 19, 2015, she released an album entitled Wabi Sabi, produced by American artist Kishi Bashi. Fox performed on an eight-city live concert tour in Japan for the new album, starting on August 18, 2015 in Shibuya, Tokyo, and ending in the city of Natori in Miyagi Prefecture on September 8, 2015.

Advertising
As of August 2015, Fox has appeared in six television commercials in Japan, including those for AEON and Nissan.

Filmography

Films
 Buried Cain (2014)
 The Kodai Family (2016)
 Eating Women (2018)
 Talking the Pictures (2019)

Television
 Crash (2008)
 Massan (2014–15)
 Shizumanu Taiyō (2016)
 Miss Beppin (2016–17)
 Our House (2016)
 Shachoshitsu no Fuyu (2017)
 Wild Hokkaido (2017–), host
 Brother and Sister (2018), Patti
 Idaten (2019), Annie Shepley Omori

References

External links
 
 
 

1985 births
21st-century American actresses
American Academy of Dramatic Arts alumni
American expatriates in Japan
American film actresses
American television actresses
American stage actresses
Living people
Marymount Manhattan College alumni
Northern Illinois University alumni
Musicians from Santa Fe, New Mexico
Santa Fe University of Art and Design alumni
Asadora lead actors
Actresses from Santa Fe, New Mexico